Jablonné v Podještědí (until 1946 Německé Jablonné; , until 1901 Gabel) is a town in Liberec District in the Liberec Region of the Czech Republic. It has about 3,700 inhabitants. The town centre is well preserved and is protected by law as an urban monument zone.

Administrative parts
Town parts of Markvartice and Zámecká and villages of Česká Ves, Heřmanice v Podještědí, Kněžice, Lada v Podještědí, Lvová, Petrovice, Pole, Postřelná and Valdov are administrative parts of Jablonné v Podještědí.

Geography
It lies mostly in the Ralsko Uplands, but the northern part of the municipal territory extends into the Lusatian Mountains. The Panenský Stream flows through the town. There are several ponds in the vicinity of the town.

History
Jablonné v Podještědí was founded by German colonizers in the 12th century. Its advantageous location on the trade route from Zittau to Prague helped the development from a village to a town, and for several centuries it became an important place of trade and customs. Around 1240, Lemberk Castle was founded by Havel of Markvartice for guarding the trade route.

Until 1918, the town was part of the Austrian monarchy (Austria side after the compromise of 1867), head of the Gabel District (later Gabel bei Niemes), one of the 94 Bezirkshauptmannschaften in Bohemia. In 1918, it became a part of independent Czechoslovakia.

In 1938, Jablonné was ceded to Nazi Germany as a result of the Munich Agreement. Until 1945, it was administered as a part of the Regierungsbezirk Aussig of Reichsgau Sudetenland. In May 1945, after the liberation of Czechoslovakia, it returned under Czechoslovak administration.

Demographics

Transport
There is a road border crossing Petrovice / Lückendorf with Germany.

Sights

Jablonné v Podještědí is known for the Lemberk Castle, which is located in the Lvová village. It is open to the public.

Basilica of Saints Lawrence and Zdislava is a basilica minor, built at the beginning of the 18th century. It is one of the leading buildings of Baroque architecture in Central Europe.

Notable people
Zdislava Berka (c. 1220–1252), saint, died here
Karl von Ergert (1795–1865), Austrian military officer
Josef Johann Mann (1804–1889), entomologist
Franz Ergert (1858–1931), Austrian industrialist
Wenzel Bürger (1869–1946), German architect
Alfred Gürtler (1875–1933), Austrian economist and politician
Hildegard Neumann (1919–2010), Nazi officer
Gert Willner (1940–2000), German politician

Gallery

References

External links

 
Cities and towns in the Czech Republic
Populated places in Liberec District
Lusatian Mountains